Lucy (1990) is a short novel or novella by Jamaica Kincaid. The story begins in medias res: the eponymous Lucy has come from the West Indies to the United States to be an au pair for a wealthy white family. The plot of the novel closely mirrors Kincaid's own experiences.

Lucy retains the critical tone of A Small Place but simplifies the style of Kincaid's earlier work by using less repetition and surrealism. The first of her books set completely outside the Caribbean, Lucy, like most of Kincaid's writing, has a strong autobiographical basis. The novel's protagonist, Lucy Josephine Potter, shares one of Kincaid's given names and her birthday. Like Kincaid, Lucy leaves the Caribbean to become an au pair in a large American city. At nineteen, Lucy is older than previous Kincaid protagonists, which lends the book a more mature and cynical perspective than in her previous fiction. Still, Lucy has pangs of homesickness and unresolved feelings about her mother, and she has never lived on her own or seen much of the world. With plenty of room for growth and Lucy becoming a photographer, the story takes the form of a künstlerroman, a novel in which an artist matures.

Lucy also joins the tradition of American immigration literature, tales that recount a newcomer's experience in the United States, such as those seen in Anzia Yezierska’s Bread Givers, Willa Cather’s My Ántonia, and Julia Alvarez’s How the Garcia Girls Lost Their Accents. Along with exploring immigration, Lucy, as does much of Kincaid's work, grapples with tensions between mother and daughter. Colonial themes of identity confusion and the connection between maternal and imperial rule stand out less clearly in Lucy than in Kincaid's earlier books but have an underlying presence in Lucy's relationship with her white, affluent employers, her homeland, and her new surroundings.

Plot summary

Eager to leave the West Indies, Lucy longs to leave her past behind. She does not feel nostalgic for her childhood and her homeland, where she felt oppressed by toxic colonial and family influences. However, on her arrival to North America, she reflects on the differences between the place that she had previously called home and where she now lives. She feels as if something is wrong because the sun is shining but the air is still cold. Additionally, she recalls fond memories of her grandmother along with her favorite foods from home that her grandmother would cook for her, both of which are no longer available to her. She moves to America to work as an au pair for a well-off family. Although she is initially enamored with their seemingly perfect life, she grows disillusioned with their lifestyle and feels alienated from the family. Despite this, she does grow close to the mother, Mariah, who reminds Lucy of both the good and bad in her own mother. The relationship between Lucy and her mother is a central theme. At one point in her relationship with Mariah, Lucy sees Mariah (her boss) and her mother as the same, because they both try to control Lucy. (At other times, Lucy feels like Mariah's friend.) Lucy also sees a resemblance when she sees Lewis, Mariah's husband, cheats on Mariah, because Lucy's own father cheated on her mother.

Throughout the book, Lucy's strained relationship with her mother drives her quest for independence and ability to create her own identity against that of her mother's. Lucy's mother was committed to her father, who had children by multiple other women. Angry that her mother valued proper, committed relationships (and taught Lucy to behave the same way) and still ended up hurt, Lucy attempts to identify herself against her mother through her multiple sexual encounters devoid of emotional attachment. This novel explores Lucy's sexuality as part of her identity search, illustrated through her various sexual encounters with men as well as her homoerotic relationship with her friend Peggy, whom Mariah dislikes for being a bad influence.

Lucy's father is not referred to as much as her mother is spoken about, so it is unclear what kind of relationship they have or if she feels as negatively towards him as she does towards her mother. Lucy's father was an older man when he married her mother, and she describes their arrangement as mutually beneficial. Her mother married someone who would not bother her too much, while she was still able to maintain appearances. Likewise, her father in his old age married someone in order to take care of him. Her father had several love affairs and children with other women before he married her mother. Some of these women tried to cause harm to both Lucy and her mother throughout their lives. Lucy's father was raised by his grandmother. His mother left him at the age of five and then at the age of seven his father left to work on the Panama Canal, and he never saw either of them again. His grandmother then died in the middle of the night one night and did not wake up the next morning.

Lucy's mother writes her many letters while she works as an au pair, but, feeling betrayed by her mother for funding her half-siblings' education over hers, she refuses to open them. When she receives notice that her father died, she hastily sends her mother money, along with a letter cutting off all communication from her. Further fueling her desire to move away from the disenchanting life of Mariah's family, she leaves on hostile terms with Mariah, moves in with Peggy and begins a relationship with a man named Paul. Despite her newfound independence, she still remains emotionally cut off from her relationships, not returning the love for Paul that he professes to her. Although by the end of the novel she reestablishes a relationship with Mariah, her independence that she sought from childhood has not been fulfilling-the novel ends with Lucy wishing she "could love someone so much that she would die from it." Though she attempts to escape her past and detach herself from her roots, she consequently detaches herself from all relationships, leaving her feeling alone.

Main characters
Lucy The narrator and protagonist who works as an au pair. She is a character of extremes, having conflicting feelings of both homesickness and wanting to escape the influence of her mother and Caribbean motherland. She has many loveless sexual encounters, yet she resents her mother for letting her husband dominate her life, as Lucy's mother gave up her career goals of being a nurse to be with Lucy's father who cheats on her and leaves her with nothing when he dies.  Lucy is also at odds with her employer Mariah, who represents another mother figure in Lucy's life; simultaneously existing as a source of comfort and disdain in Lucy's life, similar to the role her mother Annie also plays.  Lucy views both her mother Annie and Mariah as caring, comforting, and strong women who allow themselves to fall into the sexist roles that society and their husbands expect of them, thus this brings a range of extreme emotions from Lucy regarding them as they embody what Lucy longs for and disdains simultaneously. 
Annie Potter Lucy's mother. Because she discourages Lucy's aspirations and instead encourages Lucy's brothers, she resents her and does her best to sever ties with her over the course of the novel. Nevertheless, Lucy's mother is a constant presence in her life, sending her letter and coming to Lucy's mind whenever she least expects it.
Mariah Lucy's main employer and a doting, yet emotionally strained housewife struggling to maintain a semblance of stability in her family life. 
Lewis Mariah's husband. He is both physically and emotionally distant, choosing to work away from home for the better part of the novel. It is revealed that he has an affair with Dinah, Mariah's best friend. While Lucy does not feel strongly towards him for a large portion of the novel, she does become decidedly more hostile towards him once she learns of the affair. 
Tanner The boy with whom Lucy has her first sexual encounter. Though the relationship was purely physical, this begins Lucy's sexual curiosity, which manifests itself in future relationships with Hugh and others. 
Miriam The youngest daughter of Lewis and Mariah, with whom Lucy develops a special bond
Dinah Mariah's best friend and the woman with whom Lewis has an affair. Mariah and Lucy view her differently: Mariah envies her kindness and general outgoing nature, while Lucy is immediately suspicious of both her motives and true nature. 
Peggy Lucy's best friend, whom she meets while in the United States. Peggy is a carefree woman from Ireland who dazzles Lucy with her knowledge of the city and the people in it. Though the two become friends, Lucy's inability to maintain particularly close relationships with anyone makes this friendship strained towards the end. However, Lucy's decision to rent an apartment with Peggy ultimately signifies a growing sense of independence from both her mother and Mariah. 
Hugh Lucy's first boyfriend in America and Dinah's brother. Shorter, dark-haired, and good-natured, Hugh instantly makes a strong impression with Lucy. The two become immediately infatuated with each other, beginning a passionate relationship that concerns Peggy. In the end, because she does not love him, she is not sad to see him go. 
Paul Lucy's lover, who feels more for her than she does for him. Lucy is again warned against dating, as Peggy believes Paul to be a "creep."

Motifs and themes
While attending Queen Victoria girls' school, she was taught to memorize a poem about daffodils. (This poem "I Wandered Lonely as a Cloud" was written by William Wordsworth roughly two centuries ago.) The poem recalls the beauty of daffodils that the speaker has seen years ago. Lucy cannot appreciate this beauty, because daffodils do not grow on her island. After reciting the poem, Lucy is applauded and she explains that at this moment she feels fake. She feels like people see her as English on the inside, despite her strong antipathy towards them. The daffodils represent Lucy's alienation from both her education, and from her new home.
Lucy's mother continually occupies Lucy's thoughts, exciting fury, scorn, desire, and guilt. Lucy relates a huge sum of her experiences to some memory or opinion about her mother, which proves the power of the mother-daughter bond. The very departure that Lucy hopes to make with her journey to America, however, causes her sorrow, for she believes she'll never again know the kind of love she shared with her mother. Though Lucy determines that she must break with her mother to achieve adulthood, she aches powerful feelings of loss in the process.
The seasons also climax differences between Lucy's old surroundings and her new northern climate. Lucy has an attitude toward the seasons that mirrors her mixed feelings about her native country. Though she rises the amount of weather and finds the summers less cruel than at home, in the colder months, she misses the warm sun and lively colors of the island. The seasons, then, highlight both Lucy's inner and outer situations and grant them larger meaning by connecting them to a natural phenomenon experienced by many.
Lucy's letters from home brighten her difficult relationship with her mother. As Lucy takes to support her mother's unopened letters on her dresser, she shows a defiance that also betrays her daughterly attachment: she doesn't discard them and doubts the longing she'd feel if she saw her mother's words. When Lucy finally reads the letter listing her father's death and her mother's disaster, she comes to her mother's financial aid but also releases her anger in a letter home, once again representing her mixed feelings. After burning the letters she's saved, Lucy finds herself able to move on. She fixes to leave Lewis and Mariah's apartment and sends a letter home, stating empathy for her mother but also breaking with her by giving an untrue address. Throughout the novel, letters serve as markers of Lucy's struggle to make a new life for herself by dodging her past.

The role of Lucy’s past

The driving force of the novel is Lucy's past. The story begins with Lucy arriving in North America and the reader is unsure why she left her home. Lucy is continuously referring to and hinting at past events. As her character develops, one learns that Lucy's past experiences are heavily ingrained into her perspective through which the reader hears the story. As such, Lucy's past is at the root of the recurring themes within the novel.

At several points in the story, Lucy makes observations that may be unobvious to the reader. Lucy seems to see thing coming before they happen. Kincaid does this to give the impression that Lucy is notably intelligent, which turns out to be central to the novel. The author spends a lot of time dwelling on Lucy's ability to understand things, as if to point out she has a superior intellect. Readers discover later that the rift between Lucy and her mother was caused by the mother having lower expectations for Lucy. In this manner, Lucy's expression of her intelligence is directly linked to her rebellion from her mother, which happened in the past. Past of course effects future, and Lucy's fallout with her mother also resulted in her inability to love. Lucy finally obtains independence and freedom from her mother but she is unable to love because she believes that she will not be able to love anyone like she loved her mother. Due to the fact that Lucy's mother neglected her and pushed her aside after the arrival of her brothers Lucy can no longer give herself completely to anyone for fear that they will just leave her like her mother did.

Another theme that works its way into the novel is the notion of reality. Lucy feels that the people she meets lead fake lives that could be improved if they focus on what matters. She is skeptical of the happiness because of her observations about Lewis and Mariah's relationship. She is also skeptical because of the negative events that happened back home. She was unhappy enough to leave and it is fundamentally difficult for her to believe everyone is as happy as they seem. This has the effect of making Lucy seem pessimistic. From her perspective, however, she is simply realistic. This viewpoint originates from her past experiences.

Lucy's identity
Throughout the book, we see that there is the subliminal mention of the Brontë sisters, Enid Blyton, Paul Gauguin, and Lucifer. Lucy mentions that instead of being named Lucy, she should have been named after one of the Brontë sisters (Emily, Anne, or Charlotte). These three sisters were also au-pairs. Since Lucy had gone to a British school, the curriculum involved the books written by the English Bronte authors. This demonstrates how they were the only role-models she knew of, as she was not sent to a higher education institution as her brothers were. Thus, she would have liked to be named after one of the Brontë sisters instead to demonstrate both the lack of attachment to her African culture, as well as her longing for her own empowerment. This can also be conveyed through her refusal to become a nurse so that she would not have to follow the orders of "higher powers," such as doctors. Furthermore, she identifies with Lucifer because that is the origin of her name (Lucy). This reflects Lucy's embrace of her promiscuous nature, and her non-religiosity. This decimation of the roles her mother expects from her shows her rebelliousness and her resentment against her mother for not supporting her further empowerment in society. 

Lucy entered the United States as an immigrant from the Caribbean. She had to leave her native country to create a different identity for herself. When moving to a different country she felt that she need to transform not only her physical state of being, but also mental. This identity is usually influence by components such as race, class and gender. When Lucy first entered the United States, everything seems categorized with her. She saw the socials classes that were made by the people based on how they look. Immigrants tend be categorized a lot since it's in the roots of their skin. For this reason, Lucy struggled with taking on identity of a Black women once she had arrived in America. Many migrant women experience discrimination not solely because of their race, gender, sexualities, but by the experience they lived in. When entering a new country, you see the structure of the people and the ways you live. The people who are native from the country will see when one doesn't belong based on the differences on how they are living. I believe when you enter a new place it could be a negative habit to compare yourself with the people around you, but yet a lot of people do it. In a way it's a search for validation and acceptance. The problem is many seek themselves by the eyes of others. In St Johns, Antigua Lucy was known to have spent her entire life in mental and physical bondage because of the cultural norms that her society imposed on her gender. Women were looked upon as caregiver for the families and were usually in controlled by the men. This structured her to being respectful among others. This structured her mindset on being a care giver to others as well. When she arrived to America, she settles to be a nanny for a rich white family. When she was in her hometown, she didn't do much comparing since every woman and man lived the same social normality as one another. When she starts working in the U.S she sees that not everyone is lives the same life. In the U.S Lucy feels like no one could relate to her since the way she was raised was different. Everything that she saw when she first entered America seem privileged to her, so she became stubborn that everyone that she encounters has a perfect life.

Lucy struggles to define who she is as a person since she is constantly trying to fit in. Black racial identity becomes problematic because the expectations of being a black woman are purposely imposed to her. She was already expected to be pursued a certain way with the White American women. When arriving to New York she did her best to adopt as a nanny, but in a way, this allowed to slowly lose herself.   Although she does bring out positive aspects to it. As a nanny she is allowed to bring a motherly side out of her that her mom gave to her. This was a confusing feeling to Lucy, for her mother did cause a lot of traumas towards her life. Yet she still managed to get positive qualities from her mother and use them during her job. The nurture she remembered that was given to her back home allowed her to naturally be motherly to the kids. This allowed Lucy to gain a positive and comforting trait that can stick with her.

Caribbean heritage

Lucy is from the West Indies. Jamaica Kincaid is from Antigua and it can be safely assumed that Lucy's character shares the same birthplace. Though this is not stated explicitly, Lucy does make a reference to her home having been named by Christopher Columbus (who "never set foot there") after a church in Spain. Other evidence includes the similarity of Kincaid's upbringing along with that of Lucy's character and the references to Antigua being a colony despite the increase in decolonization.

Critical response

Lucy has often been interpreted through the dual lenses of postcolonial and feminist criticism. Gary E. Holcomb, for example, sees the novel as endorsing a black transnationalism view, as Lucy refuses to be constrained by "colonial, racist, and transnational values" of either Antigua or the US. Edyta Oczkowicz similarly describes Lucy's learning to tell her own story as an act of self-translation, in which she must create "a new personal 'space'" in which her identity "does not have to be defined by the roles of either colonized or colonizer."

Critics have also focused on the many intertexts on which the novel draws. Diane Simmons details the way in which the novel draws on John Milton's Paradise Lost and Charlotte Brontë's Jane Eyre, noting that Brontë was Kincaid's favorite author. David Yost observes that Lucy contains many correspondences to another Brontë novel, Villette—including the names of its primary couple (Lucy and Paul), its plot (an au pair adjusting to a foreign culture), its themes (sexual repression of women and self-recreation through art), and its setting (Villette'''s Paul dies returning from his Caribbean slave plantation)--arguing that Lucy'' acts a postcolonial reworking of this earlier text. Ian Smith focuses on the scene in which Lucy must memorize Wordsworth's "I Wandered Lonely as a Cloud" at her boarding school, despite having never seen a daffodil in Antigua. Noting that this episode recurs throughout Kincaid's work, Smith asserts that the act here of transcending an oppressive and often-nonsensical colonial education is emblematic of Kincaid's oeuvre as a whole.

References

External links
SparkNotes entry for Lucy
Interview with Jamaica Kincaid about the novel

1990 American novels
Antigua and Barbuda novels
American novellas
Novels by Jamaica Kincaid
African-American novels
Works about sexual repression